Athi Mafazwe (born 13 September 1997) is a South African cricketer. He made his Twenty20 debut for Eastern Province in the 2018 Africa T20 Cup on 14 September 2018.

References

External links
 

1997 births
Living people
South African cricketers
Eastern Province cricketers
Place of birth missing (living people)